Burundi made its Paralympic Games début at the 2008 Summer Paralympics in Beijing, sending three male athletes to compete in racing events for arm amputees (T46 category). None of them won a medal, although Rémy Nikobimeze did come fifth (out of 15) in the 5,000m race.

Burundi has never taken part in the Winter Paralympics.

Medal tables

Medals by Summer Games

Full results for Burundi at the Paralympics

See also
 Burundi at the Olympics

References

 
Paralympics